Moti Jheel is a Kanpur Metro station in Kanpur, India. It is the terminus of the Orange line. The station was opened on 28 December 2021 as part of the inaugural section of Kanpur Metro, between IIT Kanpur and Moti Jheel.

Station layout

See also
Kanpur
Uttar Pradesh
List of Kanpur Metro stations
List of metro systems
List of rapid transit systems in India

References

Kanpur Metro stations
Railway stations opened in 2021
2021 establishments in Uttar Pradesh
